Before Gardens After Gardens is the third album by Big Sir. The album features contributions by The Mars Volta’s Cedric Bixler-Zavala and Deantoni Parks, Rx Bandits’ Matt Embree and Steve Choi, bassist Jonathan Hischke and Beastie Boys producer Money Mark.

Track listing
"Regions – 4:19
"Ready On The Line" – 2:53
"Infidels" – 2:58
"Right Action" – 2:34
"The Ladder" – 2:54
"The Kindest Hour" – 4:07
"Old Blood" – 2:49
"Born With A Tear" – 4:04
"Be Brave Go On" – 3:23
"Our Pleasant Home" – 5:16
"1 Thousand Petals" – 2:09
"(I asked them) the questions" – 3:29 (vinyl download bonus track)

Personnel

Musicians
Lisa Papineau – vocals, programming
Juan Alderete – bass, programming, backing vocals
Cedric Bixler-Zavala – drums, backing vocals
Jonathan Hischke – bass
Matthieu Lesenechal – keyboards
Matt Embree – backing vocals
Steve Choi – guitar
Money Mark Ramos-Nishita – keyboards
Deantoni Parks – drum samples
Heather Lockie – viola
David Wm. Sims – bass
Teri Gender Bender – backing vocals
Melanie Benoit
Michael Morgan

Recording and editing
Robert Carranza
Lars Stalfors
Lisa Papineau
Juan Alderete
Pete Lyman

Mixing
Robert Carranza
Lars Stalfors
Lisa Papineau
Juan Alderete

Mastering
Robert Carranza

Artwork
Lisa Papineau

Layout Artist
Sonny Kay

References

2012 albums
Sargent House albums
Albums produced by Mickey Petralia
Big Sir (band) albums